Ostrožnik is a small village east of Mokronog in the Municipality of Mokronog-Trebelno in southeastern Slovenia. The municipality is part of the historical region of Lower Carniola and is now included in the Southeast Slovenia Statistical Region.

References

External links

Ostrožnik on Geopedia

Populated places in the Municipality of Mokronog-Trebelno